The West Village Historic District of Princeton, Massachusetts, encompasses the historic heart of its West Village (also variously known as "Pratt's Corner" and "Lower Village").  The  district abuts the Princeton Center Historic District to the east, and was listed on the National Register of Historic Places in 2009.

Although the district is located just west of Princeton's town center, it was originally rural in character, and only began to develop a separate village center on the junction that is now Hubbardston Road, Allen Hill Road, and Radford Road.  The oldest properties in the district are colonial-era Georgian homes, while there are Greek Revival properties built in the village during a development phase in the early 19th century.  In the second half of the 19th century the area began to develop as a resort area, and boarding houses and resort hotels were built.  Development in the area declined significantly after c. 1920.

See also
National Register of Historic Places listings in Worcester County, Massachusetts

References

Buildings and structures in Princeton, Massachusetts
Historic districts in Worcester County, Massachusetts
Historic districts on the National Register of Historic Places in Massachusetts
National Register of Historic Places in Worcester County, Massachusetts
Buildings and structures completed in 1807
Colonial architecture in the United States
Federal architecture in Massachusetts